"Throw It in the Bag" is the first single from Fabolous' album Loso's Way (2009). The song features singer The-Dream, who also provided the production alongside Tricky Stewart.

Music video
The video for "Throw It In The Bag" was released on May 28, 2009, and was directed by Erik White. It features Claudia Jordan as a thief who is stealing from a jewelry store. Talking about Vazi A's character in the video, Fabolous says "I'm kinda feelin' cats. I'm feeling her integrity, I'm feeling her style, I'm feeling her going out and taking what she wants. By the end of the video, I'm kinda looking past her being this big thief, and maybe next time she throws things in the bag is because I'm buying it for her." Christina Milian (Dream's ex-wife), Irv Gotti, DJ Clue and Ryan Leslie all make cameo appearances in the video.

The video won for Best Viewer's Choice at the 2009 BET Hip Hop Awards and ranked at number 24 on BET's Notarized Top 100 Videos of 2009 countdown.

Remix
The official remix of the song features rapper Drake. It is also accompanied by a new chorus and an entirely new beat. The new chorus is a sped up sample of "Fancy" off of The-Dream's second studio album, Love vs. Money. The only similarities are the subject matter and the line "Just throw it in the bag." It is produced by Shatek from Beats On Film. The remix was released on iTunes on August 18 in a digital 45 format, also including the original version as a B-side.

This beat has been used by rappers such as Ace Hood, Styles P, Ur Boy Bangs, and Lil Wayne, with Wayne using the remix's beat for his No Ceilings mixtape.

Official versions
 "Throw It in the Bag" (original version / explicit album version) – 3:51
 "Throw It in the Bag" (remix version) – 4:05

Charts
"Throw It in the Bag" debuted at number 84 on the Billboard Hot 100 in July 2009 and peaked at number 14.

Year-end charts

Certifications

References

External links
 Fabolous featuring The-Dream - Throw It In The Bag Official Music Video

2009 singles
Fabolous songs
The-Dream songs
Songs written by The-Dream
Songs written by Tricky Stewart
Song recordings produced by Tricky Stewart
Music videos directed by Erik White
Songs written by Fabolous
Def Jam Recordings singles
2009 songs